Michael Couture (born February 7, 1994) is a Canadian football offensive lineman for the BC Lions of the Canadian Football League (CFL).

University career
Couture played college football for the Simon Fraser Clan from 2012 to 2015.

Professional career

Winnipeg Blue Bombers
He was selected by the Winnipeg Blue Bombers with the tenth overall pick in the 2016 CFL Draft and signed with the club on May 21, 2016. He made the active roster following training camp and played in his first professional game on June 24, 2016, against the Montreal Alouettes. Couture played in all 18 regular season games in 2016 and made his post-season debut that year in the West Semi-Final against the BC Lions. In 2017, he again played in all 18 regular season games and, in 2018, he made his first professional start on September 8, 2018, against the Saskatchewan Roughriders in the Banjo Bowl.

In 2019, Couture became the team's starting centre and started in all 18 regular season games. However, he was injured in the final regular season game and missed the team's playoff run that culminated in a 107th Grey Cup victory. He returned in 2021, where he started all 14 regular season games and started in the 108th Grey Cup where the Blue Bombers repeated as champions following their overtime win over the Hamilton Tiger-Cats.

Couture missed the first regular season games of his career in 2022 as he suffered an arm injury and played in just seven games. However, he was healthy near the end of the season and contributed to the team's playoff run which ended in a defeat by the Toronto Argonauts in the 109th Grey Cup game. He became a free agent upon the expiry of his contract on February 14, 2023.

BC Lions
On February 14, 2023, it was announced that Couture had signed with the BC Lions to a two-year contract.

References

External links
BC Lions bio

Living people
1994 births
BC Lions players
Canadian football offensive linemen
Simon Fraser Clan football players
Winnipeg Blue Bombers players
Players of Canadian football from British Columbia
People from Burnaby